Parancistrocerus fulvipes also known by the common name potter wasp is a species of stinging wasp in the family Vespidae.  This species' nesting sites include borings in wood, old mud dauber and Polistes nests, and abandoned burrows of ground-nesting bees, but it may also construct its own burrows in the ground. Prey includes caterpillars of Tortricidae, Nolidae, Chloephorinae, Crambidae, and Gelechiidae.

Subspecies
These two subspecies belong to the species Parancistrocerus fulvipes:
 Parancistrocerus fulvipes fulvipes g
 Parancistrocerus fulvipes rufovestis Bohart, 1948 g b
Data sources: i = ITIS, c = Catalogue of Life, g = GBIF, b = Bugguide.net

References

Further reading

External links

 

Potter wasps
Insects described in 1856